The 2022 English Open (officially the 2022 BetVictor English Open) was a professional snooker tournament that took place from 12 to 18 December 2022 at the Brentwood Centre in Brentwood, England. The seventh ranking event of the 2022–23 season, it was the third tournament in the Home Nations Series, following the Northern Ireland Open and the Scottish Open and preceding the Welsh Open. It was the fourth of eight tournaments in the season's European Series. Qualifiers took place from 25 to 30 October at the Morningside Arena in Leicester, although matches involving the top 16 players in the world rankings were held over to be played at the final venue. Organised by the World Snooker Tour and sponsored by BetVictor, the tournament was broadcast by Eurosport in the UK and Europe. The winner received £80,000 from a total prize fund of £427,000.

On the first day of the tournament, the WPBSA suspended Yan Bingtao from professional competition, making him the seventh player suspended from the tour since October amid a major match-fixing investigation.

Neil Robertson was the defending champion, having defeated John Higgins 9–8 in the 2021 final. However, he was beaten 4–6 by Mark Selby in the semi-finals, meaning that he lost at the semi-final stage in each of the season's first three Home Nations events. Selby recorded his first win over Robertson in two years, after seven consecutive losses to him, and reached his first ranking final since winning the 2021 World Championship. He went on to win the event, defeating Luca Brecel 9–6 in the final to capture his 21st ranking title. He became the first player to win the English Open twice, and the second player, after Judd Trump, to win four Home Nations tournaments.

Mark Williams made the tournament's highest break, the third maximum break of his career, in the fourth frame of his quarter-final match against Robertson. Aged 47 years and 270 days, he became the oldest player to make an officially recognised maximum break in professional competition.

Prize fund
The breakdown of prize money for this event is shown below:
 Winner: £80,000
 Runner-up: £35,000
 Semi-final: £17,500
 Quarter-final: £11,000
 Last 16: £7,500
 Last 32: £4,500
 Last 64: £3,000
 Highest break: £5,000
 Total: £427,000

Main draw

Top half

Bottom half

Final

Qualifying 
Qualification for the tournament took place from 25 to 30 October 2022 at the Morningside Arena in Leicester, England.

Main Qualifying 
A single pre-qualifying match was played before the main qualifying draw was conducted:
 PQ3:  4–2 

 4–1 
 (32) 1–4 
 4–0 
 0–4 
 (17) 4–1 
 3–4 
 w/d–w/o 
 2–4 
 2–4 
 4–2 
 3–4 
 (28) 4–1 
 0–4 
 4–2 
 (21) 4–1 
 4–3 
 4–0 
 (20) 4–3 
 3–4 
 1–4 
 (29) 1–4 
 2–4 
 4–0 
 (30) 4–2 
 4–0 
 4–1 
 (19) 4–2 
 0–4 
 2–4 
 (22) 2–4 
 0–4 
 4–1 
 (27) 4–2 
 3–4 
 4–3 
 (26) 0–4 
 4–0 
 4–0 
 (23) 2–4 
 4–0 
 4–0 
 (18) 4–2 
 4–1 
 2–4 
 (31) 4–1 
 4–3

Held-Over Matches
Matches involving the Top 16, the defending champion and the nominated wild-card players were played at the Brentwood Centre. The matches involving winners from the held-over pre-qualifying matches were also held over to the venue.
PQ1:  4–0 
PQ2:  4–1 

  (1) 4–0 
  (16) 4–2 
  (24) 1–4 
  (9) 4–1 
  (25) 4–0 
  (8) 4–3 
  (5) 4–0 
  (12) 4–2 
  (13) 4–2 
  (4) 4–3 
  (3) 4–3 
  (14) 1–4 
  (11) 4–3 
  (6) 4–0 
  (7) 4–2 
  (10) 4–1 
  (15) w/d–w/o 
  (2) 4–3

Notes

Century breaks

Main stage centuries

Total: 73

 147, 135, 134, 130, 123  Mark Williams
 142, 136, 100  Ali Carter
 141, 135, 113, 109, 100  Mark Allen
 141, 130, 127, 122, 110, 102, 100  Neil Robertson
 137, 105  Mark Joyce
 136, 134, 121  Lei Peifan
 136, 128, 127, 105, 104, 102  Mark Selby
 135, 122, 113, 108, 101  Luca Brecel
 135  Zhao Xintong
 130, 126, 103  Ryan Day
 129, 125, 122, 122, 102  Thepchaiya Un-Nooh
 128, 118  Judd Trump
 128, 118  Martin Gould
 128  Scott Donaldson
 127, 126, 101  Barry Hawkins
 127, 119, 111, 105  Shaun Murphy
 124  Ding Junhui
 121, 111  Jack Lisowski
 121  Pang Junxu
 118  Sam Craigie
 114  Louis Heathcote
 113  Matthew Selt
 111  Marco Fu
 106  Cao Yupeng
 106  Noppon Saengkham
 104  Ronnie O'Sullivan
 103  John Higgins
 102  Jamie Jones
 102  Yuan Sijun
 101  Ashley Hugill
 101  Tian Pengfei

Qualifying stage centuries

Total: 26

 141  Michael White
 140  Wu Yize
 138, 134, 106  Ding Junhui
 134  Muhammad Asif
 132  David Gilbert
 122  Alfie Burden
 122  Chen Zifan
 120, 105  Xu Si
 118  Lu Ning
 112, 100  Sam Craigie
 109  Mohamed Ibrahim
 109  Jamie Jones
 107, 100  Dylan Emery
 104  Chang Bingyu
 104  Martin Gould
 103  Ricky Walden
 101  Fan Zhengyi
 101  Zhang Anda
 101  Zhou Yuelong
 100  Ali Carter
 100  Mark Davis

References 

2022
2022 in English sport
English Open
English Open
Home Nations Series
European Series
2022